Raiteros are drivers who transport groups of low-wage workers to their jobs for a fee. Raiteros are most commonly used by immigrant farmworkers and workers at distant factories or warehouses.  The services often are illegal and often charge exploitative fees of the workers.

In Chicago and in parts of Central New Jersey, raiteros play an expanded role in selecting employees and paying them on behalf of the employer or temp agency.

See also
Jitney

References

Transportation in Chicago
Migrant workers
Taxis
Informal economy